Madhulika (Lika) Guhathakurta is an American astrophysicist and scientist with NASA's Heliophysics Science Division. She was the lead program scientist for NASA's Living With a Star initiative and serves as program scientist on the Solar Dynamics Observatory (SDO), Van Allen Probes, and Solar TErrestrial Relations Observatory (STEREO) missions. Lika was previously the program scientist on SPARTAN-201 (Shuttle Point Autonomous Research Tool for Astronomy-201), a free-flying science instrument platform designed to study velocity and acceleration of the solar wind and observe the sun's corona. These missions were conducted as part of the larger STS-56, STS-69, STS-77, STS-87, and STS-95 mission objectives. She has worked as an educator, scientist, mission designer, directed and managed science programs, and has built instruments for spacecraft. Dr. Guhathakurta is known for her work in heliophysics where she has authored over 70 publications on the subject. She served as the NASA Lead Scientist for the North American Solar eclipse of August 21, 2017.

References

External links
NY Times Op-Ed: How's the Weather on the Sun?
NPR: On Point - Mysteries of the Sun
NBC Today Show: Lester Holt Interview
The Atlantic: Solar Probe Plus
CNN Starting Point: Soledad O'Brien Interview
New Scientist: SDO
New Scientist: Largest Sunspot in 25 Years
Wired Magazine: Rethinking Space Weather
USA Today: Weather Forecast in Space
Boston Globe: Solar Activity/Climate Change
Christian Science Monitor: Solar Storms Ahead
Huffington Post: Space Weather Threat
FOX: Lou Dobbs Interview
Heliophysics: LWS Overview
Smithsonian Air & Space: From Skylab to Interplanetary Space Weather - The Next Frontier
Smithsonian Air & Space: Meet the Lecturer
Peak Prosperity Podcast: Our Tech-Dependent Lifestyle is Vulnerable to Solar Flares
Peak Prosperity Podcast: Revisiting Our Vulnerability to Solar Flares
LWS Interview
Sun-Earth Day Podcast
The 25th Hour Radio Show: 2017 North American Solar Eclipse
Applied Artificial Intelligence for Science & Exploration Enabled by Public-Private Partnerships

NASA people
American physicists
Bengali scientists
21st-century Bengalis
Scientists from Kolkata